Batu Kenema F.C (aka Batu Kenema) is an Ethiopian football club, in the city of Batu Town, East Shewa Zone, Oromia Region.

References 

Football in Ethiopia